John H. "Shebo" Shultz (c. 1909 – November 28, 1932) was an American football player. 

Shultz attended Pen Argyl High School in eastern Pennsylvania. He played college football for Temple from 1927 to 1929. As a senior in 1929, he converted on 48 of 52 runs for first down. While playing for Temple, The Philadelphia Inquirer described him as Temple's best defensive back and a "star of the first order."

He also played professional football in the National Football League (NFL) as a fullback for the Frankford Yellow Jackets in 1930. He appeared in six NFL games, one as a starter.

Shultz later  became coach of the undefeated Ashland High School football team. He died in an automobile crash in November 1932. He was buried at St. Elizabeth's Cemetery in Pen Argyl, Pennsylvania.

References

Year of birth missing
1932 deaths
American football fullbacks
Frankford Yellow Jackets players
Temple Owls football players
High school football coaches in Pennsylvania
Sportspeople from Northampton County, Pennsylvania
Coaches of American football from Pennsylvania
Players of American football from Pennsylvania
Road incident deaths in Pennsylvania
1900s births